The An Post GAA Hurling Team of the Millennium was chosen in 2000 to comprise, as a fifteen-member side divided as one goalkeeper, three full-backs, three half-backs, two midfielders, three half-forwards and three full-forwards, the best hurling team of all-time.

The team, announced by GAA President Seán McCague on 24 July 2000 at a special function in Croke Park, was selected by a special committee, comprising five past GAA presidents - Joe McDonagh, Con Murphy, Paddy Buggy, Pat Fanning and Séamus Ó Riain - as well as GAA director-general Liam Mulvihill and four Gaelic games journalists: Paddy Downey, Mick Dunne, Seán Óg Ó Ceallacháin and Jim O'Sullivan.

The initiative was sponsored by An Post, who issued special commemorative stamps of the millennium team members.



Controversy

While universal agreement on such a team would prove impossible, the selection committee came in for some criticism regarding omissions and changes from the earlier GAA Hurling Team of the Century.

Kilkenny's D. J. Carey was seen as a shock omission from the team. As the holder of a then record seven All-Stars, Carey, whose inter-county career began in 1989, was seen as one of the greatest goal-scorers of his era and was hotly tipped to get one of the half-forward spots for which he was nominated.

The 1990s were regarded as a golden age of hurling with many new teams emerging, however, this was not reflected in the team. Clare's Brian Lohan had been tipped for full-back but Wexford's Nick O'Donnell held on. There were no places for any of the Clare team that emerged to win two championships in the nineties. Brian Whelehan was the only player from the previous 20 years to make the team.

An absence of players from Galway also sparked off major controversy in that county where the selection committee were accused of belittling the county by not recognising any of its heroes.

There was anger too in Wexford over the dropping of full-forward Nicky Rackard from the Team of the Century. Former midfielder Dave Bernie, who won an All-Ireland medal in 1968, when Rackard was a selector, said Wexford fans were stunned by the news he had not been included.

References

Hurling awards
2000 in hurling